The communauté de communes du canton de Combles  is a former communauté de communes in the Somme département and in the  Picardie region of France. It was created in December 1993. It was merged into the Communauté de communes de la Haute Somme in 2013.

Composition 
This Communauté de communes comprised 19 communes:

Carnoy
Combles
Curlu
Équancourt
Étricourt-Manancourt
Flers
Ginchy
Gueudecourt
Guillemont
Hardecourt-aux-Bois
Hem-Monacu
Lesbœufs
Longueval
Maricourt
Maurepas
Mesnil-en-Arrouaise
Montauban-de-Picardie
Rancourt
Sailly-Saillisel

See also 
Communes of the Somme department

References 

Combles